PlayPenn is a new play development conference located in Philadelphia, Pennsylvania. Paul Meshejian is the Founding Artistic Director of the organization, which works with playwrights to develop new plays in a collaborative workshop environment.

Since PlayPenn's first conference in 2005, the organization has been hosting annual July conferences in Philadelphia, where invited playwrights work with actors, directors, dramaturgs and designers to rehearse, revise and develop their new scripts in workshops. The conference includes free public readings of the plays, as well as forums and symposia.

PlayPenn has helped develop over 140 new plays, 60% of which have become over 350 full productions at theater companies in the United States and abroad. Playwrights who have workshopped scripts at PlayPenn include Jeffrey Hatcher, Deb Margolin, Aaron Posner, Michael Hollinger, Samuel D. Hunter, J.T. Rogers, and Lauren Yee. In 2017, PlayPenn saw the first of its plays to go to Broadway, J.T. Rogers' Oslo, which won the Tony Award for Best Play. 

PlayPenn supports playwrights through The Foundry, its three-year membership program to support emerging playwrights in Philadelphia with professional development, networking opportunities, and exposure.  PlayPenn also offers classes and workshops during other months throughout the year, as well as consultations and support for playwrights from dramaturgs and editors.

History
Paul Meshejian, an actor and director, created PlayPenn in 2005 after working at the Playwrights' Center in Minneapolis. Michele Volansky has been his artistic partner since the beginning as associate artist and dramaturg. Meshejian said he wanted to create an encouraging space for writers, he told Jessica Foley of American Theatre (magazine) in 2015. "We'll feed you, provide lodging, so you ... can just write your play."

While PlayPenn's main goal is to nurture new plays, not necessarily to lead them to productions, PlayPenn scripts have become full productions at many Philadelphia theaters, as well as at other theaters around the country.

In 2014, PlayPenn began entering into partnerships with theater companies to help guide plays through the last phases of development before a formal production. The organization began by pairing with the Playwrights Theatre of New Jersey to shepherd the play The House That Jack Built by Suzanne Bradbeer.

In 2018, PlayPenn artistic director Paul Meshejian was honored with the Lifetime Achievement Award at the Barrymore Awards for Excellence in Theatre.

In 2019, supported by a meaningful gift from Leonard Haas and the Wyncote Foundation, PlayPenn established the Haas Fellows Program, honoring each of its six Conference playwrights with the title "Haas Fellow" into the unforeseeable future.

The next year, the COVID-19 pandemic caused the conference to go on hiatus until 2021.

Conferences
For the 2018 PlayPenn conference, over 800 playwrights applied and six were chosen for workshops and free public readings. The conference also includes readings of up to three additional theatrical works in progress, along with forums where participants discuss issues related to new-play development.

Playwrights and plays
Plays developed by PlayPenn, 2005-present

2019

Archipelago by Amy Witting
Buffalo Bill or How To Be A Good Man by Meghan Kennedy
Cave Canem by A. Emmanuel Leadon
Esther Choi and the Fish that Drowned by Stephanie Kyung Sun Walters
Homeridae by Alexandra Espinoza
How a Boy Falls by Steven Dietz
Incendiary by Dave Harris
Strange Men by Will Snider
The Haunted Life by Sean Daniels adapted from the novel by Jack Kerouac
The Piper by Kate Hamill
Wayfinding by Whitney Rowland

2018

Bruise & Thorn by J. Julian Christopher
Dimenticar by Mattie Hawkinson
Down in the Holler by Val Dunn
Honor Flight by Willy Holtzman
Joan by Stephen Belber
Kids Drop (Off) by Dominic Anthony Taylor
Ripe Frenzy by Jennifer Barclay
Tha Chink-Mart by Ray Yamanouchi
The Garbologists by Lindsay Joelle
TJ Loves Sally 4 Ever by James Ijames
You, The Fire, and Me by Sevan K. Greene

2017

Bobby James by Anne Marie Cammarato
Bottle Fly by Jacqueline Goldfinger
Galilee by Christine Evans
Hard Cell by Brent Askari
House of the Negro Insane by Terence Anthony
Pancake Queen by Brie Knight
penny candy by Jonathan James Norton
Replica by Mickey Fisher
Thirst by C.A. Johnson
Welcome to Fear City by Kara Lee Corthron
With by Carter W. Lewis

2016

Another Kind of Silence by Lauren Feldman
Flat Sam by Antoinette Nwandu
Heartland by Gabriel Jason Dean
Heavenly Cosmic by Meghan Kennedy
Poor Edward by Jonathan Payne
The Found Dog Ribbon Dance by Dominic Finocchiaro
Sensitive Guys by MJ Kaufman
Suicide Jockey by Lena Barnard

2015

Giantess by Genne Murphy
Human Error by Eric Pfeffinger
Oslo by J.T. Rogers
Prince Max’s Trewly Awful Trip to the Desolat Interior by Ellen Struve
White by James Ijames
Widower by David J. Jacobi
War Stories by Richard Dresser
r/LYPSE: a subreddit of our dark lips and heart by Brian Grace-Duff
Shitheads by Douglas Williams

2014

The Dizzy Little Dance of Russell DiFinaldi by Stephen Belber
A Scar by Anne Marie Cammarato
Behind the Motel by Emily Schwend
Wild Blue by Jen Silverman
Cattle Barn, Hoochie Coo by Davey Strattan White
Mr. Wheeler’s by Rob Zellers
Moon Cave by Douglas Williams
Honor Flight by Willy Holtzman
The House That Jack Built by Suzanne Bradbeer

2013

The Most Spectacularly Lamentable Trial of Miz Martha Washington by James Ijames
Cockfight by Peter Gil-Sheridan
Informed Consent by Deborah Zoe Laufer
No Such Thing by Lisa Dillman
Profiles by Joe Waechter
Terminus by Gabriel Jason Dean
Uncanny Valley by Thomas Gibbons
The First Mrs. Rochester by Willy Holtzman

2012

A Discourse on the Wonders of the Invisible World by Liz Duffy Adams
G.O.B. by Willy Holtzman
Too Much, Too Much, Too Many by Meghan Kennedy
Household Spirits by Mia McCullough
My Tidy List of Terrors by Jonathan James Norton
Seven Spots on the Sun by Martin Zimmerman
The Three Christs of Manhattan by Seth Rozin
Barcelona by Bess Wohl

2011

The Hatmaker’s Wife formerly A Man, His Wife, and His Hat by Lauren Yee
American Wee-Pie by Lisa Dillman
Another Girl by John Yearley
Nerine by Brian Quirk
Slip/Shot by Jacqueline Goldfinger
The Electric Baby by Stefanie Zadravec
Chasing Waves by Quinn Eli
At the Edge of a Promised Land by Jesse Bernstein

2010

Clementine in the Lower Nine by Dan Dietz
Etched in Skin on a Sunlit Night by Kara Lee Corthron
Hum by Nicholas Wardigo
Love and Communication by James J. Christy
Raising Jo by Charlotte Miller
The Whale by Samuel D. Hunter
Imagining Madoff by Deb Margolin
The Outgoing Tide by Bruce Graham
Cowboy/Indian by Matt Ocks
Some Other Kind of Person by Eric R. Pfeffinger

2009

410 Gone by Frances Ya-Chu Cowhig
Appetite by Arden Kass
Blood and Gifts by J.T. Rogers
Ghost-Writer by Michael Hollinger
The Specificity of Paradise by John Orlock
We Three by Mary Hamilton
The Morini Strad by Willy Holtzman
Two Jews Walk Into a War by Seth Rozin

2008

Another Man’s Son by Silva Semerciyan
Breadcrumbs by Jennifer Haley
A Human Equation by Peter Bonilla
House of Gold by Gregory Moss
Saving Grace (now entitled Salvation) by James McClindon
Wildflower by Lila Rose Kaplan
Dear Brutus by Jeffrey Hatcher
Any Given Monday by Bruce Graham
The Beef by Katie Grey

2007

The Rant by Andrew Case
The Day of the Picnic by Russell Davis
After Adam by Christina Ham
Militant Language by Sean Christopher Lewis
There or Here by Jennifer Maisel
My Name is Asher Lev by Aaron Posner
Carlo vs. Carlo by Aaron Cromie
Bubu the Terrible by Rick DesRochers

2006

A Scream by Gina Barnett
Bad for the Jews by Peter Morris
Malignancy by Eric R. Pfeffinger
Scarcity by Lucy Thurber

2005

We Are Not These Hands by Sheila Callaghan
Act a Lady by Jordan Harrison
The Overwhelming by J.T. Rogers
On Clarion by Lydia Stryk

See also

Culture of Philadelphia

References

External links

Trade shows in the United States
Annual events in Pennsylvania
Culture of Philadelphia
Theatre in Pennsylvania